The Executive Council of Nova Scotia (informally and more commonly, the Cabinet of Nova Scotia) is the cabinet of the Canadian province of Nova Scotia.

Almost always made up of members of the Nova Scotia House of Assembly, the cabinet is similar in structure and role to the federal Canadian cabinet, though smaller in size with different portfolios.

The Lieutenant Governor of Nova Scotia, as representative of the King in Right of Nova Scotia, heads the council, and is referred to as the Governor-in-Council. Other members, who minister the viceroy, are selected by the Premier of Nova Scotia and appointed by the Lieutenant-Governor. Most cabinet ministers are the head of a ministry, but this is not always the case.

Current cabinet
The current ministry has been in place since August 31, 2021, when Premier Tim Houston established his cabinet.

See also
Westminster system
Executive Council (Commonwealth countries)
Nova Scotia House of Assembly
Nova Scotia Council
Legislative Council of Nova Scotia

External links
 Executive Council of Nova Scotia

Executive Council of Nova Scotia